Samuel Anderson was a Scottish professional footballer who played as an inside left.

Career
Anderson played for Hamilton Academical, Bradford City and Third Lanark. For Bradford City, he made 14 appearances in the Football League and two in the FA Cup. World War I then intervened, and Anderson was loaned back to Scottish clubs, spending two seasons with Airdrieonians and one back at Hamilton. After the conflict he returned home on a permanent basis with Third Lanark, later going out on loan again, this time to lower division teams as his career wound down.

Sources

References

19th-century births
Year of death missing
Scottish footballers
Hamilton Academical F.C. players
South Shields F.C. (1889) players
Airdrieonians F.C. (1878) players
St Bernard's F.C. players
Nithsdale Wanderers F.C. players
Bathgate F.C. players
Bradford City A.F.C. players
Third Lanark A.C. players
Scottish Football League players
English Football League players
Scottish Junior Football Association players
Association football inside forwards
Place of birth missing
Place of death missing